"Mountains" is a song by Scottish band Biffy Clyro, released as a single on 18 August 2008. Originally released as a non-album single, it would later be included on the band's fifth studio album, Only Revolutions, in 2009. It was originally entitled "Teeth or Mountains" and was first played live at the Electric Festival in Getafe, Spain, on 30 May 2008.

"Mountains" is the band's highest-charting single on the UK Singles Chart, peaking at number five. It topped the Scottish Singles Chart, giving Biffy Clyro their third number one there. Outside the United Kingdom, "Mountains" reached number 55 in Australia and number 42 in Ireland.

Release and reception

Taking a short break from touring with Say Anything in March 2008, the band recorded the song in Los Angeles, with producer Garth Richardson, who produced the band's previous album, Puzzle.

After appearing in many of the band's summer setlists, the song made its radio debut on Zane Lowe's BBC Radio 1 show on Friday 19 June 2008 and was introduced as "The Hottest Record in the World Today".

To coincide with the single's physical release, the band embarked on a promotional tour across the UK performing acoustic sets in record stores and signing copies of the single.

Composition
The song is notably more radio-friendly than the band's previous releases, due to its fairly normal song structure and heavy emphasis on melody. It is also one of their first songs to feature a piano.

Use in media
The song was used for the credits for XXXX Gold Beach Cricket. Mountains was included on Colin McRae: DiRT 2 in a video tribute to the late Scottish rally driver Colin McRae. This song also appears on Shift 2: Unleashed and SBK X: Superbike World Championship.

B-sides
"Paperfriend" was a track recorded for Puzzle in 2007 that didn't make the cut. Lyrics from the track, "Help Me Be Captain", can be heard in the song. "Little Soldiers" appeared in the band's acoustic sets promoting the single.

Track listings
Songs and lyrics are by Simon Neil, music by Biffy Clyro. All songs were published by Good Soldier Songs.
UK CD single 
 "Mountains"
 "Little Soldiers"

UK 7-inch picture disc 1 
A. "Mountains"
B. "Paperfriend"

UK 7-inch picture disc 2 
A. "Mountains"
B. "Robbery"

Digital download
 "Mountains" – 3:23

Personnel
Credits are lifted from the CD and 7-inch release liner notes.
 Simon Neil – guitar, piano, vocals, writer
 Ben Johnston – drums, vocals
 James Johnston – bass, vocals, recording (of "Little Soldiers" & "Robbery")
 Garth Richardson – producer
 Andy Wallace – mixing
 David Schiffman – engineering
 Ben Kaplan – engineering
 Mike Fraser – engineering (of "Paperfriend")
 John O'Mahony – mix engineer
 Howie Weinberg – mastering
 Mark Williams – mixing (of "Little Soldiers" & "Robbery)
 Frank Arkwright – mastering (of "Little Soldiers", "Robbery" & "Paperfriend")
 Alex H. N. Gilbert – artist and repertoire, and additional production
 OXEN – cover art and design

Charts

Weekly charts

Year-end charts

Certifications

References

Biffy Clyro songs
14th Floor Records singles
2008 singles
2008 songs
Number-one singles in Scotland
Song recordings produced by Garth Richardson
Songs written by Simon Neil